Kabo (Kabusgan) Island is a small island off the coast of the main island of Mindanao; administratively it is in Surigao del Norte of the Caraga Region of the Mindanao island group of the Philippines. The island is owned by the Calderon Family in Surigao.

Geography
Kabo (Kabusgan) Island lies  eastward across the bay from Surigao City. The island is irregular in shape elongated along a northeast–southwest line. On the shore side the mangroves form a brackish intermediate zone with no clear shoreline. On the Hintuan Passage side, the shore is generally clear cut. There is a reef, the Kabo Reef, about a half kilometer north of the island that extends to the northeast and east of the island. Load Island is immediately to the south.

Notes
 

Islands of Surigao del Norte